Rugudzha is a rural locality (a selo) and the administrative centre of Rugudzhinsky Selsoviet, Gunibsky District, Republic of Dagestan, Russia. The population was 1,641 as of 2010.

Geography 
Rugudzha is located 12 km southwest of Gunib (the district's administrative centre) by road. Khopor and Khutni are the nearest rural localities.

References 

Rural localities in Gunibsky District